Megachile hungarica is a species of bee in the family Megachilidae. It was described by Mocsáry in 1877.

References

Hungarica
Insects described in 1877